"Bonaparte's Retreat" is the name of two related songs. The original was a wordless melody that existed as various fiddle tunes dating back to at least the late 1800s and probably well before that. In 1950, American country music artist Pee Wee King recorded a modified version of the song, with lyrics added, which he also called "Bonaparte's Retreat". This latter song has been covered by many country artists.

Original song
The title of the original "Bonaparte's Retreat" was a reference to Napoleon Bonaparte's disastrous retreat from Russia in 1812, which led to his downfall and finally ended the danger that he would invade England. Some 19th-century British folk songs celebrated the event.

In 1937, American ethnomusicologist Alan Lomax, while travelling through Kentucky, recorded violinist William Hamilton Stepp playing "Bonaparte's Retreat". This recording was inducted in 2016 into the Library of Congress's National Recording Registry.

Stepp's version of the song was used as a major component of Aaron Copland's song "Hoe-Down" from the ballet Rodeo. "Hoe-Down" has in turn been covered by various artists, including Emerson, Lake and Palmer on their 1972 album Trilogy. It has also received use in television and film, including the American TV ad campaign "Beef. It's What's For Dinner".

Pee Wee King version
In 1950, Pee Wee King released "Bonaparte's Retreat" as a single. This version slowed down the melody and added lyrics, about dancing with and wooing a girl. King's lyrics refer to the original song in the chorus: "I kissed her while the guitars played the 'Bonaparte's Retreat'".

King's song peaked at number 10 on the Billboard Hot Country Singles chart. Kay Starr recorded the song later in 1950. Her version peaked at number 4 on the Billboard Hot 100. Billy Grammer recorded and charted (#50) in 1959 with a crossover pop and country version.

Glen Campbell then covered the song for his 1974 album Houston (I'm Comin' to See You). It was released in July 1974 as the album's second single. Campbell's version peaked at number 3 on the Billboard Hot Country Singles chart. It also reached number 1 on the RPM Country Tracks chart in Canada.

Willie Nelson also covered the song as a bonus track on the reissue of his 1975 concept album Red Headed Stranger.  In addition, the song was covered by Michael Nesmith and the Second National Band's 1972 album Tantamount to Treason Vol. 1.

Chart performance

Pee Wee King

Kay Starr

Glen Campbell

References

1950 singles
1974 singles
Pee Wee King songs
Kay Starr songs
Glen Campbell songs
Songs written by Pee Wee King
Song recordings produced by Jimmy Bowen
Capitol Records singles
1950 songs
United States National Recording Registry recordings
Songs about Napoleon